The 2016 international cricket season was from May 2016 to September 2016.

Season overview

Rankings
The following are the rankings at the beginning of the season:

May

Sri Lanka in England

2016 ICC World Cricket League Division Five

Final standings

Kenya in Papua New Guinea

June

2016 West Indies Tri-Series

India in Zimbabwe

Sri Lanka in Ireland

Pakistan Women in England

July

Afghanistan in Scotland

Afghanistan in Ireland

Pakistan in England

India in West Indies and USA

Australia in Sri Lanka

New Zealand in Zimbabwe

Afghanistan in Netherlands

August

South Africa Women in Ireland

United Arab Emirates in Scotland

Nepal in Netherlands

2016 ICC Europe Division Two

Final standings

Pakistan in Ireland

New Zealand in South Africa

Hong Kong in Ireland

September

Bangladesh Women in Ireland

Hong Kong in Scotland

References

External links
 2016 season on ESPN Cricinfo

2016 in cricket